Neoleria inscripta is a species of fly in the family Heleomyzidae. It is found in Europe.

References

Heleomyzidae
Articles created by Qbugbot
Insects described in 1830
Taxa named by Johann Wilhelm Meigen